Mehdi Jamalinejad (born 1970) is an Iranian writer, conservative politician and the previous Mayor of Yazd city. He was elected as Mayor of Isfahan from June 21, 2015, to August 22, 2017, succeeding Morteza Saghaian Nejad, who held the position from 2003 to 2015. He was the city's youngest Mayor of Isfahan since 1979, and previously held positions in the city's municipality like Deputy Mayor in Civil affairs. He was also CEO of Malaysia based I.S. GOSTAR M company.

References

1970 births
Living people
University of Isfahan alumni
Writers from Isfahan
Mayors of Isfahan
People from Yazd